The Municipality of Horjul is a municipality in the Inner Carniola region of Slovenia. Its seat is the town of Horjul.

Settlements
In addition to the municipal seat of Horjul, the municipality also includes the following settlements:

 Koreno nad Horjulom
 Lesno Brdo
 Ljubgojna
 Podolnica
 Samotorica
 Vrzdenec
 Zaklanec
 Žažar

References

External links
 
 Municipality of Horjul on Geopedia
 Municipality of Horjul, official website

Horjul
1998 establishments in Slovenia